Jain is a surname of Indian origin and reflects the Jain religious community. Notable people with the surname include:

 Abigail Jain, actor
 Ajit Jain, businessman
 Anand Jain, business executive
 Anil Jain (disambiguation), several people
 Anjli Jain, American businesswoman
 Anshu Jain, British Indian financier
 Bhagchandra Jain, scholar
 Bhavarlal Jain, industrialist
 BM Jain, political scientist
 Dipak C. Jain, business educator
 Jainendra K. Jain, physicist
 Kamini Jain, Canadian Olympic kayaker
 Meenakshi Jain, Indian political scientist and historian
 Naveen Jain, Indian-American Internet entrepreneur
 Nirmal Jain (born 1966/67), Indian billionaire, founder of India Infoline
 Piyare Jain (1921–2019), Indian-American physicist
 Raj Jain, Indian-American computer science professor
 Rakesh Jain, Indian-American tumor biologist
 Ramesh Jain, Indian-American computer science professor
 Ravindra Jain, Indian music composer, lyricist and playback singer
 S. Lochlann Jain, American author and anthropologist
 Sachin H. Jain, American physician and policy analyst
 Sanjay Jain, Indian-British economist
 Sunny Jain, American musician
 Tarang Jain (born 1962/63), Indian billionaire businessman

Indian surnames